Thonon-les-Bains, often simply referred to as Thonon,  is a subprefecture of the Haute-Savoie department in the Auvergne-Rhône-Alpes region in Eastern France. In 2018, the commune had a population of 35,241. Thonon-les-Bains is part of a transborder metropolitan area known as Grand Genève. It is situated on the shores of Lake Geneva (or simply ).

History

Thonon-les-Bains was the historic capital of Chablais, a province of the old Duchy of Savoy. The Chablais Savoyard is the portion of Chablais in France. Chablais Valaisan and Chablais Vaudois are those portions of Chablais in the adjacent Switzerland cantons Valais and Vaud.(cite: Chablais Wikipedia) The town was the capital of the Dukedom of Chablais.

During the debates on the future of the Duchy of Savoy in 1860, the population was sensitive to the idea of a union of the northern part of the duchy with Switzerland. A petition circulated in this part of the country (Chablais, Faucigny, Northern Genevois), but it collected no more than 13,600 signatures. The duchy was reunited after a plebiscite organised on 22 and 23 April 1860 under Napoleon III, in which 99.8 percent of the Savoyards voting were reported to have answered "yes" to the question "Does Savoy want to be reunited to France?"

Population

Transport

Thonon-les-Bains station has rail connections to Lyon, Évian-les-Bains, Annemasse and Geneva.

Local transport is assured by BUT (Bus urbains thononais). The lines are:
 Line A: Destination Grangette / Destination Multiplex
 Line B: Destination Z.I VONGY / Destination Place des arts
 Line C: Destination Collège Théodore Monod / Place des arts
 Line D: Destination Collège theodore Monod or Espace Leman / Place des arts
 Line L: Destination Amphion Village / Place des arts
 Line P: Destination Marin / Place des arts
 Line M: Destination La Chavanne / Place des arts
 Line N: Destination Parking des chateaux / Place des arts

Map of the network: http://www.leman-but.fr/ftp/FR_plan/Plan%202012%202013.pdf

Line H and J are used in Évian-Les-Bains, and not Thonon-Les-Bains.

Main sights

 Arboretum de Ripaille
 Château des Guillet-Monthoux
 Château de Ripaille
 Château de Sonnaz
 Château de Thuyset
 Saint-Hippolyte church (12th century), rebuilt in Savoy Baroque-style during the 17th century
 Funiculaire de Thonon-les-Bains

Twin towns (sister cities)
Thonon-les-Bains is twinned with:
  Eberbach, Germany
  Mercer Island, United States
  Čačak, Serbia

See also
Communes of the Haute-Savoie department

References

External links

 Official website 
 Office of Tourism 

Communes of Haute-Savoie
Spa towns in France
Subprefectures in France
Populated places on Lake Geneva